Sergey Sergeyev (born 28 June 1983) is a Russian futsal player who plays for MFK Dinamo Moskva and the Russian national futsal team.

References

External links 
 FIFA profile
 UEFA profile
 AMFR profile

1983 births
Living people
Russian men's futsal players
MFK Dinamo Moskva players